Luis Sánchez may refer to:

Luis Sánchez (alpine skier) (born 1940), Spanish Olympic skier
Luis Sánchez (baseball) (1953–2005), baseball player
Luis Sánchez (basketball), Peruvian Olympic basketball player
Luis Sánchez (Cuban footballer) (born 1952), Cuban footballer
Luis Sánchez (Colombian footballer) (born 2000)
Luis Alberto Sánchez (1900–1994), Peruvian lawyer
Luis Alberto Sánchez Rodríguez, Mexican footballer
Luis Ángel Sánchez (born 1993), Guatemalan racewalker
Luis Augusto Sánchez (1917–1981), Colombian chess player
Luis León Sánchez (born 1983), Spanish cyclist
Luis Miguel Sánchez Cerro (1889–1933), Peruvian army officer
Luis Rafael Sánchez (born 1936), Puerto Rican playwright
Luis Sánchez Betances (born 1947), attorney
Luis Sánchez Duque (born 1956), Spanish football manager